Oxyurida is an order of nematode worms of the class Secernentea. It consists of four families, one of which contains the human pinworm (Enterobius vermicularis).

Species
Notable species include:
 Enterobius vermicularis, the human pinworm
 Gyrinicola batrachiensis, a parasite or mutualist of amphibian tadpoles
 Syphacia oryzomyos, a parasite of the marsh rice rat (Oryzomys palustris)
 Skrjabinema ovis, a parasite of ruminants

References 

 
Parasitic nematodes of vertebrates
Nematode orders